Square Club may be

Square Club (writers), a dining club in Edwardian London
Harlem Square Club in the Overtown neighborhood of Miami, FL known for soul music